Incontinence underwear is a type of reusable undergarment designed to absorb urine. It provides an alternative to traditional disposable incontinence products, which are often bulky and plastic-based. Due to concerns about the environmental impact of disposable products, incontinence underwear is becoming an alternative to pads. Only recently has the textile technology existed to enable the design and manufacture of reusable products with comparable functionality to a disposable pad or diaper.

Incontinence 
It is estimated that 1 in 4 women over the age of 35 experience some level of urinary incontinence, often following childbirth or during menopause. Incontinence is also experienced by approximately 1 in 10 men, commonly related to prostate issues.  Incontinence is more prevalent with age, and is commonly experienced by those 65 and over. Due to increased life expectancy and decreased fertility rates, the world population is experiencing a "global greying", which has contributed to an increase in the global market for incontinence products as there is an increasing proportion of people aged over 65.

Fabric incontinence underwear 
Fashionable reusable underwear alternatives to pads and diapers have emerged. Some of these new washable products still feature built-in absorbent pads or insertable disposable pads, but some of the players in the market offer consumers options which are increasingly like normal underwear. These companies have developed highly absorbent fabrics that combine several moisture-trapping fabric layers to achieve a similar absorbent result to traditional pads. This new-style incontinence underwear looks and feels like normal underwear so it can be washed and reused, whilst being discreet. This offers the user economic and environmental savings. The use of fabric textiles in these new incontinence products also means that it is now possible to make fashionable incontinence underwear.

Incontinence underwear products are generally designed to cater for light bladder leakage (LBL), and as such have lower absorbency capabilities than high absorbency pads and diapers.  

Some manufacturers of disposable products are responding to the changing market dynamics by introducing disposable incontinence underwear that gives the appearance of normal fabric underwear. These manufacturers aim to imitate how normal underwear sits on the body, to make the underwear more discreet and comfortable. Examples of this include underwear sold by TENA and Depend (undergarment). These efforts to normalize incontinence products, and provide consumers with more options, shows the industry recognition of the need to reduce the stigma around urinary incontinence, and offer wearers product choices that are more comfortable and less bulky.

Products available for those with severe urinary incontinence are still predominantly single use disposable pads.

Related types of incontinence products include absorbent pads for chairs or beds, and underwear for children who experience nocturnal enuresis.

Market growth

The US incontinence market is forecast to reach a value of US$1.6 billion by 2017, driven by an aging population and a gradual breakdown of the taboo surrounding incontinence. These factors will contribute to increased numbers of people needing incontinence products which allow them to continue living their lives whilst experiencing the condition. Globally the market is set to grow by between 4 and 7% per annum.

Incontinence underwear manufacturers include Australian-based Night N Day Comfort, Canadian-based Caretex, the UK’s Capatex Care (which make the ‘Kylie’ range), and the US-based Wearever. Companies that make incontinence pads include Kimberly-Clark (Depend and Poise brands), Sweden’s SCA (TENA brand) and Domtar (Attends brand).    

A new category of fashionable incontinence underwear has also recently emerged. Among these companies are Night N Day Comfort (who modify Australian underwear brand BONDS underwear by sewing-in their incontinence pad), Icon Underwear and Confitex, who in 2015 showed a collection of high-end, pad-free incontinence lingerie on the runway at New Zealand Fashion Week.

See also 
 Adult diaper
 Incontinence pad

References

External links 

 Independent continence product advisor

Undergarments